Howrah - Lalkuan Express is a Express train of the Indian Railways connecting Howrah Junction in West Bengal and Lalkuan Junction of Uttarakhand. It is currently being operated with 12353/12354 train numbers on a weekly basis.

Service

The 12353/Howrah - Lal Kuan Weekly SF Express has an average speed of 55 km/hr and covers 1348 km in 24 hrs 25 mins. The 12354/Lal Kuan - Howrah Weekly SF Express has an average speed of 55 km/hr and covers 1348 km in 24 hrs 25 mins.

Route and halts 

The important halts of the train are:

Coach composite

The train has standard LHB rakes with max speed of 130 kmph. The train consists of 16 coaches :

 2 AC II Tier
 3 AC III Tier
 8 Sleeper Coaches
 2 General
 2 Second-class Luggage/parcel van

Traction

Both trains are hauled by a Howrah Loco Shed based WAP-4 electric locomotive from end to end.

Rake Sharing 

The train shares its rake with 13025/13026 Howrah - Bhopal Express

See also 

 Lalkuan Junction railway station
 Howrah Junction railway station
 Howrah - Bhopal Express

Notes

External links 

 12353/Howrah - Lal Kuan Weekly SF Express
 12354/Lal Kuan - Howrah Weekly SF Express

References 

Rail transport in Howrah
Express trains in India
Rail transport in Bihar
Rail transport in West Bengal
Rail transport in Jharkhand
Rail transport in Uttar Pradesh
Rail transport in Uttarakhand
Railway services introduced in 2012